Physula albipunctilla is a species of moth in the family Erebidae first described by William Schaus in 1916. It can be found on the Antilles and Cuba, as well as Florida and Georgia.

References

Herminiinae
Moths described in 1916